Boris Ignatyvich Gudz (1902 – 27 December 2006) was a veteran of the October Revolution and the Russian Civil War, an OGPU security agent, and at the time of his death the last surviving Chekist of the first generation.

Biography
Gudz was born at Ufa in the Russian Empire, where his parents moved following a revolutionary movement in Ukraine. He joined the Bolshevik Party in his early teens after his father was arrested for revolutionary activity. He participated in the October Revolution and later fought in the Red Army against the White Army during the Russian Civil War. In 1923, Gudz began his career in the State Political Directorate (OGPU) as a junior member of the staff involved in operation Trust. Later, he was appointed head of the OGPU intelligence and counterintelligence department in East Siberia, and then in 1933 in Japan.

In 1937, after his sister was arrested during the Great Purge, he was expelled from the Soviet Communist Party and dismissed from the Red Army, but was soon restored to the Party and the Army.

Gudz died on 27 December 2006, aged 104 years. His funeral ceremony took place in Moscow. When he died, he was the oldest surviving veteran of both the October Revolution and subsequent Civil War.

The Russian writer and Gulag survivor Varlam Shalamov was his brother-in-law.

Photos
 1936: http://shalamov.ru/gallery/57/3.html 
 1955-56: http://shalamov.ru/media/images/gallery/579.jpg 
 Boris Gudz as a centenarian, records file in hand: Файл:Борис Игнатьевич Гудзь.jpg

References

1902 births
2006 deaths
Politicians from Ufa
Old Bolsheviks
NKVD
Russian communists
Military personnel from Ufa
Russian centenarians
Men centenarians
People of the Russian Revolution
Institute of Red Professors alumni